Humberto Bernasconi Galvar (born 17 December 1912, date of death unknown) was an Uruguayan basketball player. He competed in the 1936 Summer Olympics.

References

External links

1912 births
Year of death missing
Basketball players at the 1936 Summer Olympics
Olympic basketball players of Uruguay
Uruguayan men's basketball players